Leg spin is a type of spin bowling in cricket. A leg spinner bowls right-arm with a wrist spin action. The leg spinner's normal delivery causes the ball to spin from right to left (from the bowler's perspective) when the ball bounces on the pitch. For a right-handed batsman, that is away from the leg side, and this is where it gets the name leg break.

Leg spinners bowl mostly leg breaks, varying them by adjusting the line and length, and amount of side spin versus topspin of the deliveries. Leg spinners also typically use variations of flight by sometimes looping the ball in the air, allowing any cross-breeze and the aerodynamic effects of the spinning ball to cause the ball to dip and drift before bouncing and spinning or "turning", sharply. Leg spinners also bowl other types of delivery, which spin differently, such as the googly.

The terms 'leg spin', 'leg spinner', 'leg break' and 'leggie' are used in slightly different ways by different sources.

The bowlers with the second- and fourth-highest number of wickets in the history of Test cricket, Shane Warne and Anil Kumble, respectively, were leg spinners. One famous example of leg spin is Warne's Ball of the Century.

History
In the 1970s and 1980s, it was thought that leg spin would disappear from the game due to the success of West Indian, and later Australian teams, exclusively using fast bowlers. During this time Abdul Qadir of Pakistan was the highest-profile leg spinner in the world and is sometimes credited with "keeping the art alive". However, leg spin has again become popular with cricket fans and a successful part of cricket teams, driven largely by the success of Shane Warne, beginning with his spectacular Ball of the Century to Mike Gatting in 1993.

Comparison with other types of bowling
A left-handed bowler who bowls with the same (wrist spin) action as a leg spinner is known as a left-arm unorthodox spin bowler. The ball itself spins in the opposite direction.

The same kind of trajectory, which spins from right to left on pitching, when performed by a left-arm bowler is known as left-arm orthodox spin bowling.

As with all spinners, leg spinners bowl the ball far more slowly (70–90 km/h or 45–55 mph) than fast bowlers. The fastest leg spinners will sometimes top 100 km/h (60 mph). While very difficult to bowl accurately, good leg spin is considered one of the most threatening types of bowling to bat against for a right-handed batsman, since the flight and sharp turn make the ball's movement extremely hard to read, and the turn away from the right-handed batsman is more dangerous than the turn into the right-handed batsman generated by an off spinner. Any miscalculation can result in an outside edge off the bat and a catch going to the wicket-keeper or slip fielders. Alternatively, for a ball aimed outside the leg stump, the breaking may be so sharp that the ball goes behind a right-handed batsman and hits the stumps – the batsman is then said (informally) to be "bowled around his legs". A left-handed batsman has less difficulty facing leg spin bowling, because the ball moves in towards the batsman's body, meaning the batsman's legs are usually in the path of the ball if it misses the bat or takes an edge. This makes it difficult for the bowler to get the batsman out bowled or caught from a leg break.

Leg spin: Some sources make the term 'leg spin' synonymous with leg break, implying that other deliveries bowled by a leg spinner do not count as 'leg spin'. However, other sources use the term 'leg spin' more widely, to include all deliveries bowled by a leg spinner, including non-leg break deliveries. 

Leg break: In the definition of a leg break, some sources actually include the bowler being a leg spinner, which implies that only leg spinners can bowl leg breaks; all leg breaks are bowled by leg spinners. Other sources do not include the bowler being a leg spinner in the definition of a leg break, and say a leg break is simply a delivery that spins from the legside to the offside, and so can also be bowled by other types of bowler. In this case, leg breaks are (only) mostly bowled by leg spinners.

Leg spinner: The term leg spinner can be used to mean either the bowler or the leg break delivery.

Leggie: The term leggie can also be used to mean either the bowler or the leg break delivery.

Technique
A leg break is bowled by holding the cricket ball in the palm of the hand with the seam running across under all the fingers. As the ball is released, the wrist is rotated to the left and the ball flicked by the ring finger, giving the ball an anti-clockwise spin as seen from behind.

To grip the ball for a leg-spinning delivery, the ball is placed into the palm with the seam parallel to the palm. The first two fingers then spread and grip the ball, and the third and fourth fingers close together and rest against the side of the ball. The first bend of the third finger should grasp the seam. The thumb resting against the side is up to the bowler but should impart no pressure. When the ball is bowled, the third finger will apply most of the spin. The wrist is cocked as it comes down by the hip, and the wrist moves sharply from right to left as the ball is released, adding more spin. The ball is tossed up to provide flight. The batsman will see the hand with the palm facing towards them when the ball is released.

Notable leg spin bowlers

Players listed below have been included as they meet specific criteria which the general cricketing public would recognise as having achieved significant success in the art of leg spin bowling. For example: leading wicket-takers, and inventors of new deliveries.

 Shane Warne – 708 Test wickets (second all-time), one of five Wisden Cricketers of the Century
 Bernard Bosanquet – credited with inventing the googly
 B. S. Chandrasekhar – took 16 five-wicket hauls
 Clarrie Grimmett – 216 Test wickets
 Anil Kumble – 619 Test wickets (currently 4th on the list of all-time Test cricket wicket takers), best bowling in an innings of 10/74 
 Abdul Qadir – took 10 wickets in a match on five occasions
 Tich Freeman - 3776 first-class wickets, the second of all time and the most of any leg spin bowler.

Other deliveries bowled by leg spin bowlers

Highly skilled leg spin bowlers are also able to bowl deliveries that behave unexpectedly, including the googly, which turns the opposite way to a normal leg break and the topspinner, which does not turn but dips sharply and bounces higher than other deliveries. A few leg spinners such as Abdul Qadir, Anil Kumble, Shane Warne and Mushtaq Ahmed have also mastered the flipper, a delivery that like a topspinner goes straight on landing, but floats through the air before skidding and keeping low, often dismissing batsmen leg before wicket or bowled. Another variation in the arsenal of some leg spinners is the slider, a leg break pushed out of the hand somewhat faster, so that it does not spin as much, but travels more straight on.

See also
 Ball of the Century
 Flipper
 Googly
 Off break
 Topspinner

References

External links 
 About Leg Spin – talkCricket 
 Leg Spin Definition – Oxford Dictionaries
 Leg Spin Basics video – wisdomtalkies
 How to bowl leg spin – BBC Sport

Cricket terminology
Bowling (cricket)